The 2010 RCNJC season was the second and final season for the Rugby Canada National Junior Championship.

Standings

Western Conference

Eastern Conference

Note: 4 points for a win, 2 points for a draw, 1 bonus point for a loss by 7 points or less, 1 bonus point for scoring 4 tries or more.

Playoffs

References

Canada RCNJC Season
2010 in Canadian rugby union